Family Park Tycoon is a business simulation video game for the Nintendo DS developed by German studio VIS Games and Entertainment, a division of Visual Imagination Games and Software, and published by Astragon. Game play focuses on amusement park management.

Family Park Tycoon has been cancelled in the UK. There will be no UK-version of the game family park tycoon, but the German version includes English language.

External links
Theme park returns to Nintendo DS, brings the family, Cubed3.
Official site 
Review, Planet Nintendo.de 
Review, Wiig.de 
Review, nintendo-online.de 
Review, dlh.net 
gamefox.de 
nintendofront.de 

Nintendo DS games
2008 video games
Nintendo DS-only games
Amusement park simulation games
Video games developed in Germany